Senadhipathige Granville Rodrigo,(born 22 September 1958 – died 14 January 1999 as ග්‍රැන්විල් රොද්‍රිගෝ) [Sinhala]), popularly known as Granville Rodrigo, was an actor in Sri Lankan cinema, stage drama and television as well as a singer and art director. Highly versatile actor from drama to comedy, he is best known for the role in Manokaya and role Nihal Karapitiya in Nonawaruni Mahathwaruni teledrama. He was also a former navy officer.

He died on 14 January 1999 at the age of 40, while receiving treatments after a road accident.

Personal life
He was born on 22 September 1958 in Colombo, Sri Lanka. He completed education from De La Salle College, Modera and St. Benedict's College, Colombo.

He married Shamali Rodrigo on 17 January 1987. The couple had three sons - Chirath, Thisal and Madupa.

Career
He started acting career with the stage drama Mahasara directed by maestro Ediriweera Sarachchandra. He played varied roles in Maname, Sinhabahu, Simon Nawagattegama's Subha Saha Yasa. Dharmasiri Bandaranayake's Ekadipathi, Vijitha Gunaratna's Sakya. Rodrigo started his film career with a minor role in 1978 film Veera Puran Appu directed by renowned filmmaker Lester James Peries. Some of his popular cinema acting came through Seilama, Mohothin Mohotha and  Thunweni Yamaya. He also acted in Hector Kumarasiri's teledramas such as Dikkasadaya and Nikma Yaama. He was the lead actor in Nikma Yaama teleplay.

Apart from acting, he was a renowned art director. In 1985, he won the award for Best Art Direction at Presidential Film Awards in Dharmasiri Wickremaratne's Himakatara and in 1986 Sarasaviya Award for the Dharmasiri Bandaranayake's Suddilage Kathawa.

He was a Radio Ceylon singer who sang the popular songs such as Ota Damanya, Mayawo Akal Mako, Devale Natha Deviyo and Chandana Maldam. He released a song cassette Ota Damanya comprising 16 dance numbers in Veddha songs which get enormous popularity in outdoor musical shows. He acted and directed music for K.A.W. Perera's Paasal Guruwari as well.

Selected Stage Dramas
 Mahasara
 Maname
 Sinhabahu
 Malawunge Rathriya
 Meepura Wasiyo
 Suba Saha Yasa
 Ekadipathi
 Sakya

Selected Tele Dramas
 Bim Kaluwara
 Dikkasadaya
 Kadaima
"Lokanthaya"
"Pasal Guruwariyak"
 Manookaya
 Nikma Yaama
 Nonawaruni Mahathwaruni
 Sinasenna Mata
 Suseema 
 Tharu
 Maalathi Mal

Death
On 10 January 1999, Rodrigo was involved in a head on collision at Maharagama junction while travelling in a van to participate in a Dhamma School prize giving with fellow actors. He was seated in the front of a van at the accident and his legs were broken below the knee with the impact. He had several large burn injuries on his legs and right foot due to boiling radiator water splashing on him. He was quickly admitted to the accident service ward of the National Hospital, Colombo. His burn wounds were treated with an ointment and was given an antibiotic with the intravenous saline. After being admitted to Ward 74, it was noticed that he is getting healed, where he started to smile and talk slightly with wife. On 13th, he coughed up some blood and on 14th doctors ordered an ESR test. The test indicated a high level of white blood cells. However, he died on 14 January 1999 due to septicaemia caused by infected burn wounds on his legs. According to specialist doctors, a blood clot forms due to contusions and through feces it travels to the lungs and blocks its blood supply. His postmortem report, revealed haemorrhaging in the lungs, kidneys and liver due to sepsis. But, doctors said that he showed no external signs of sepsis.

His funeral took place at Madampitiya public cemetery.

Legacy
On 4 May 2002, a rugby tournament named Granville Rodrigo Memorial Junior Novices Rugby Tournament 2002' was held at Vistwyke Playgrounds Mattakkuliya in memory of the actor. The chief organizer of the event was Basil Rodrigo.

Filmography
 No. denotes the Number of Sri Lankan film in the Sri Lankan cinema.

References

 Official website

Sri Lankan male film actors
1958 births
1999 deaths
Road incident deaths in Sri Lanka
Sri Lankan male stage actors
Sri Lankan male television actors
20th-century Sri Lankan male singers